The R707 is a Regional Route in South Africa that connects Frankfort with Marquard via Petrus Steyn, Lindley, Arlington and Senekal.

Route
Its north-eastern terminus is a junction with the R34 just west of Frankfort. From there, it runs south-west for 55 kilometres to the town of Petrus Steyn, where it meets the R57 east of the town centre. The R707 and R57 are co-signed southwards for 2 kilometres before the R707 becomes its own road to the south-west. Just after splitting from the R57, the R707 meets the northern terminus of the R724 Road.

It continues south-west for 30 kilometres to meet the southern terminus of the R725 Road and enter the town of Lindley. After passing through Lindley southwards, it crosses the R76 Road south of the town. The route continues south-west from Lindley, through Arlington, to reach a junction with the N5 National Route and the R70 Route east of Senekal.

All 3 routes are co-signed westwards for 8 kilometers, through Senekal Central. In Senekal West, as the R70 becomes the road northwards and the N5 remains on the westerly road, the R707 becomes the road to the south-west from this junction. It heads for 43 kilometres south-west to end at Marquard at an intersection with the R708 Road.

External links
 Routes Travel Info

References 

Regional Routes in the Free State (province)